Condrie Collen Mkans is a South African Technogist. Born in Mpumalanga,  Bushbuckridge at village called Welverdiend in Bemani section.

He attended primary level at Mtembeni Primary school in 1997, he did high school in Mahlale high school website.

$5,000.

References

External links
 https://web.archive.org/web/20121206030505/http://www.jamespatterson.com/college-book-bucks-winners.php

Scholarships in the United States
Awards established in 2010